Italy women's national inline hockey team is the national team for Italy. The team finished ninth at the 2011 Women's World Inline Hockey Championships.

References 

National inline hockey teams
Inline hockey
Inline hockey in Italy